The 2011–12 CONCACAF Champions League preliminary round was played from July to August 2011. The first legs were played July 26–28, 2011, and the second legs were played August 2–4, 2011.

The draw for the preliminary round and the group stage was held on May 18, 2011, at the CONCACAF headquarters in New York City. Teams from the same association (excluding "wildcard" teams which replace a team from another association) may not be drawn with each other.

A total of 16 teams competed, divided into eight ties. Each tie was played over two legs, and the away goals rule would be used, but not after a tie enters extra time, and so a tie would be decided by penalty shootout if the aggregate score is level after extra time. The winners of each tie advanced to the group stage to join the eight automatic qualifiers.

Matches

|}

All Times U.S. Eastern Daylight Time (UTC−04:00)

First leg

Second leg

Toronto FC won 4–2 on aggregate.

FC Dallas won 2–0 on aggregate.

Morelia won 7–0 on aggregate.

3–3 on aggregate. Isidro Metapán won on away goals.

Seattle Sounders FC won 2–1 on aggregate.

Santos Laguna won 4–3 on aggregate.

Herediano won 10–2 on aggregate.

Motagua won 4–2 on aggregate.

Notes
Note 1: Tempête of Haiti played both of its Preliminary Round matches in the CONCACAF Champions League against Morelia in Mexico due to incomplete renovations to Stade Sylvio Cator in Port-au-Prince.

References

External links
 CONCACAF Champions League official website

Preliminary Round